Syed Muhammad Rafi Uddin is an Independent Pakistani politician who has represented PP-228 Lodhran in the Provincial Assembly of the Punjab since the 2022 by-election.

References 

Year of birth missing (living people)
Place of birth missing (living people)
Independent politicians in Pakistan
Punjab MPAs 2018–2023